Janina Korolewicz-Waydowa (1875–1955) was a Polish soprano and opera director, the world's first female opera house director.

Life
Janina Korolewicz-Waydowa was born in Warsaw on 3 January 1875 or 22 December 1876, the daughter of Piotr Korolewicz, an official, and Ewa née Teraszkiewicz. She trained under Walery Wysocki at the Lviv Conservatory.

Aged 17,Korolewicz-Waydowa made her debut as Hanna in The Haunted Manor. She sang with the Warsaw Opera from 1898 to 1902, before joining the Berlin Opera. For a season she was at the Teatro Nacional de São Carlos in Lisbon, and then the Royal Opera in Madrid. She continued performing internationally – in Venice, Bucharest, Odessa (now Odesa), Kiev (now Kyiv), St. Petersburg, Kharkov (now Kharkiv), London, New York and Chicago – until 1913, when she returned to Warsaw. She managed the Warsaw Opera from 1917 to 1919 and 1934 to 1936.

References

1875 births
1955 deaths
Polish operatic sopranos
Polish opera directors
Female opera directors